Berka is a river of Hesse, Germany. It springs west of Frankenhain, a district of Berkatal. It is a left tributary of the Werra, where it enters south of Albungen, a district of Eschwege.

See also
List of rivers of Hesse

References

Rivers of Hesse
Rivers of Germany